Neil Donald Martin (born 19 August 1979) is a former English cricketer.  Martin was a right-handed batsman who bowled right-arm fast-medium.  He was born at Enfield, Middlesex.  He was educated in St Albans, Hertfordshire, attending Wheatfields Primary and Verulam School.

Martin made his debut for Middlesex in a List A match against Gloucestershire in the 1997 AXA Life League.  In that same season he made a single Youth Test match appearance for England Under-19s against Zimbabwe Under-19s.  The following season, he made two first-class appearances for Middlesex against Oxford University and Northamptonshire, he wasn't required to bat in either match and took just a single wicket.  He made a second and final List A appearance in that same season, against Essex in the AXA Life League. taking a total of 3 wickets in this two matches in that format, which came at an average of 19.00, with best figures of 2/28.  He wasn't required to bat in either of his List A appearances.

References

External links
Neil Martin at ESPNcricinfo
Neil Martin at CricketArchive

1979 births
Living people
People from Enfield, London
English cricketers
Middlesex cricketers